Learn To Read is an adult educational TV series that consists of 30 programs, hosted by entrepreneur and literacy advocate Wally Amos. Co-instructors include Doris Biscoe (who was an anchorwoman for WXYZ-TV in Detroit, Michigan) and Charlotte Scot. Caitlyn Jenner (then Bruce) guest-starred on the first episode. This was based on 27 million Americans having almost no reading skills. On Friday, there is a review of the week. The final program reviews the entire series.

In every episode (excluding programs 1, 5, 10, 15 and 30) a "Getting Along" segment is used, with either Sylvia Glover or Jim Johnson (both formerly of WXYZ's Good Afternoon Detroit) as instructors.

Aside, there's Les the Letter Man and Nancy the Word Woman. Finally, there is Billy Green, referred to as the "Book Guy", telling viewers to get their workbook.

Learn to Read was produced by Kentucky Educational Television in association with WXYZ-TV (the copyright is owned by both KET and E.W. Scripps, then Scripps Howard Broadcasting), funded by the Kmart Corporation, the Corporation for Public Broadcasting and donors to PBS. The program was produced at WXYZ's studios in Southfield, Michigan, with additional production done by KET in Kentucky.

The program was televised on many PBS member stations, as well as syndicated to commercial stations. The program was also seen locally on WXYZ-TV, generally weekday mornings at 5AM.

Episodes are available online through YouTube.

Episode status

While episodes originally consist of a 6-week daily course, some stations air episodes on a less-frequent basis, as little as once a week. New York City PBS station WNET was the last PBS affiliate to air the show and aired it daily (sometimes twice daily) before pulling it from its lineup in 2009.

Initially, Learn To Read was produced solely by WXYZ-TV in Detroit. It was originally offered free to every ABC affiliated television station in the United States by VP/General Manager Jeanne Findlater, who created the idea and wrote the format. She sold the entire underwriting costs to Chrysler, K-Mart, Kroger, and McDonald's after convincing them that they had to use their commercial time to promote literacy, not their products. On behalf of the station, she received the national Charles W. Scripps Literacy Award presented by Barbara Bush.

Learn To Read was later syndicated to PBS state network Kentucky Educational Television, who marketed it throughout the United States. In the first broadcast, Findlater scheduled the program at 5:30 am and at 10:00 am. The idea for the early morning time slot came from Doug Frazier years before. Frazier, then president of the UAW-CIO, urged Findlater to create a literacy series and run it at the end or start of a work-shift. Findlater said ratings for the early morning slot weren't available but many letters sent to her indicated that those viewers did not want their kids to know they couldn't read. The series has been widely used in prisons.  Estimates of total viewership (from 2002) were over 18 million people.

Cast
 Wally Amos as the host
 Doris Biscoe as a co-instructor
 Charlotte Scot as a co-instructor
 Sylvia Glover as herself, in some Getting Along segments
 Jim Johnson as himself, in some Getting Along segments
 Billy Green as himself
 Les Raebel as Les the Letter Man

See also
 Operation Alphabet (TV series)
 A Place of Our Own

Notes

References

External links
 

1990s American television series
Adult education television series
PBS original programming
1987 American television series debuts
2009 American television series endings
Reading and literacy television series
Television in Detroit
Kentucky Educational Television